Alex Ivanovici is a Canadian actor and theatre director. He is most noted for his supporting role in the film Winter Stories (Histoires d'hiver), for which he was a Genie Award nominee for Best Supporting Actor at the 20th Genie Awards.

He is married to playwright Annabel Soutar, with whom he cofounded the Porte Parole theatre company.

References

External links

20th-century Canadian male actors
21st-century Canadian male actors
Canadian male film actors
Canadian male television actors
Canadian male stage actors
Canadian people of Romanian descent
Canadian theatre directors
Male actors from Montreal
Living people
Year of birth missing (living people)